In enzymology, a thiamine diphosphokinase is an enzyme that catalyzes the chemical reaction

ATP + thiamine  AMP + thiamine diphosphate

Thus, the two substrates of this enzyme are ATP and thiamine, whereas its two products are AMP and thiamine diphosphate.

This enzyme belongs to the family of transferases, specifically those transferring two phosphorus-containing groups (diphosphotransferases). The systematic name of this enzyme class is ATP:thiamine diphosphotransferase. Other names in common use include thiamin kinase, thiamine pyrophosphokinase, ATP:thiamin pyrophosphotransferase, thiamin pyrophosphokinase, thiamin pyrophosphotransferase, thiaminokinase, thiamin:ATP pyrophosphotransferase, and TPTase. This enzyme participates in thiamine metabolism.

Structural studies

References

 
 
 

EC 2.7.6
Enzymes of known structure